The Samoa flying fox or Samoan flying fox (Pteropus samoensis) is a species of flying fox in the family Pteropodidae. It is found in American Samoa, Fiji, and Samoa (where it is known as pe'a and pe'a vao). Its natural habitat is subtropical or tropical dry forests.

Description

It has a fox-like face with a pointed muzzle, a brown body and wings and the fur on its head and shoulders is blond or silvery-grey.

Distribution and habitat
The Samoan flying fox is native to Fiji, Samoa and American Samoa. Its habitat is primary or secondary moist forest, plantations, agroforest and the vicinity of villages. Unlike most flying foxes, this species roosts alone or in small family groups.

Biology
This bat is mostly diurnal, making foraging expeditions in early mornings and late afternoons. The diet consists mainly of fruit but leaves, flowers and nectar are also eaten. A single offspring is born each year, usually in May or June. The juveniles begin to fly when they are about half the size of the adults, but may remain dependent on their mothers until three-quarters of her size.

Status
The IUCN lists the Samoan flying fox as being "Near Threatened". Populations of this bat are thought to be in slow decline, but it has a wide range, and it is quite common within that range, and the rate of decline is believed not to be sufficient to justify putting it in a more-threatened category. The main threats it faces are forest clearance and the hunting of it for food. In the 1980s, it was killed commercially for export as a luxury food item, but a stop was put to that trade when it was listed in Appendix I of CITES in 1990. This made it illegal to export it for commercial purposes, and hunting since then has been on a smaller scale and only for domestic use. It is present in some national parks and other protected areas which gives it some measure of protection.

Samoan mythology
The Samoan word for the flying fox fruit bat, pe'a, is also the name of the traditional Samoan male tattoo.
In Samoan and Polynesian mythologies, stories, myths, proverbs, and legends are associated with this winged creature. One legend from the island of Savai'i in Samoa is about Nafanua, goddess of war; she was rescued by flying foxes when stranded on an inhospitable island, similar to the goddess, Leutogi.

2020 American Samoa quarter

In 2018, the U.S. Mint had several candidate designs developed for the 2020 America the Beautiful National Park of American Samoa Quarter, which was in accordance with the act that authorized them. One of the designs features the familiar image of George Washington by John Flanagan, used on the quarter (heads) since 1932. The (tails) of the quarter features a Samoan fruit bat mother hanging in a tree with her pup. The image represents the remarkable care and energy that this species puts into their offspring. This design is intended to promote awareness to the threatened status of this species due to habitat loss and commercial hunting. The National Park of American Samoa is the only known park in the United States that is home to the Samoan fruit bat. The bats on the coins were designed by Richard Masters, who worked as Professor Emeritus at the University of Wisconsin Oshkosh's Department of Art. The designs were selected by the Citizen's Coinage Advisory Committee (CCAC) and the Commission on Fine Art (CFA). The coin was released to the public in February 2020, and will be followed by four other America the Beautiful quarters for the remainder of 2020.

References

Pteropus
Bats of Oceania
Mammals of American Samoa
Mammals of Fiji
Mammals of Samoa
Near threatened animals
Near threatened biota of Oceania
Mammals described in 1848
Taxonomy articles created by Polbot
Taxa named by Titian Peale